Matthew D. Adler (born December 8, 1966) is an American film actor. He is best known for his supporting roles in the 1980s teenage films: Teen Wolf, White Water Summer, North Shore, and Dream a Little Dream.  He currently works on additional dialogue recording for feature films.

In 1986 he auditioned for the role of "Bill S. Preston Esquire" in Bill & Ted's Excellent Adventure being one of the final picks along with Keanu Reeves, Donovan Leitch and Gary Riley. The role ultimately went to Alex Winter who had initially auditioned for the part of Ted "Theodore" Logan.

Film and television credits

Personal life
Adler was married to actress Ria Pavia from 1993 to 1995. He is currently married to actress Laura San Giacomo and is a close friend and former housemate of actor George Clooney.

References

External links

1966 births
Male actors from Los Angeles
American male film actors
American male television actors
American male voice actors
Lee Strasberg Theatre and Film Institute alumni
Living people
20th-century American male actors
21st-century American male actors